Pcheda is a traditional game held in Viswema, Nagaland that requires players to throw thin bamboo sticks from a set distance. An open competition is held annually in the month of January.

Game
Pcheda is played with thin dried bamboo sticks called Opche. The players are divided into two teams. The teams then compete to throw the bamboo stick through a platform on a solid mud to the farthest distance possible where the winner is determined by the team which throws the stick to the farthest distance.

See also
 List of traditional Naga games and sports

References

External links

Viswema
Naga games